Qadry Rahmadan Ismail (born November 8, 1970), nicknamed "the Missile", is a former American football wide receiver. He was drafted by the Minnesota Vikings in the second round (52nd overall) of the 1993 NFL draft. He played college football at Syracuse.

He also played for the Miami Dolphins, New Orleans Saints, Baltimore Ravens (with which he won Super Bowl XXXV), and the Indianapolis Colts.

Early years
Qadry Rahmadan Ismail was born on November 8, 1970 in Newark, New Jersey, the son of Ibrahim and Fat'ma Ismail. In 1985, he moved to his grandmother Laura Bauknight's home in Wilkes-Barre, Pennsylvania, where he attended Elmer L. Meyers Junior/Senior High School. There, Ismail and his older brother Raghib were named the inaugural recipients of the Martin Luther King Youth Leadership Award given by the local chapter of the NAACP of Northeast Pennsylvania. In addition to playing high school football, Ismail also ran track.

As a member of the track team, he was ranked the nation’s best high school hurdler by Track & Field News in 1988. He finished first at the 110m high hurdles Golden West Invitational. He was also a two time state team champion in track and field. He was a six-time PIAA AA State champion in the 110m high hurdles, 300m intermediate hurdles, and 4x100. He was a two-time PIAA AA silver medalist in the 4x400, as well as a bronze medalist in the 110m high hurdles. He was a four time PIAA District II team champion, and 12 time PIAA District II champion. He also earned two WVC team conference championships.

As a member of the football team, he was a two time All-scholastic selection as a wide receiver and defensive back. He was inducted into the PIAA Coaches Association Hall of Fame. He was named the 1988 Athlete of the Year by The Citizens' Voice and the Times Leader.

College career
Ismail attended Syracuse University, where he was a member of the football team as well as the track team. Ismail was the first two-sport All-American at Syracuse since Jim Brown in 1957.

As a member of the track team, Ismail was an All-American in the indoor 55m hurdles, as well as the outdoor 110m hurdles. He was also an IC4A 110m hurdle and 55m hurdle champion. Ismail was also the Big East champion in the 110m hurdles, as well as the 55m hurdle and 4x400 relay while also setting Syracuse University’s school record in the 55m hurdles and the 4x400 relay.

As a member of the football team, Ismail was an All-American selection as a kick returner in 1991. He was also a first team All-Big East selection as a wide receiver and kickoff returner, and a second team all-Big East selection as wide receiver.

Career statistics

Professional career
Ismail was selected in the second round (52nd overall) of the 1993 NFL draft by the Minnesota Vikings, becoming the highest drafted Syracuse player since Moose Johnston.

In 1999, he was voted Number 22 on the list of top 100 athletes by the Citizen’s Voice.

In 1999 with the Baltimore Ravens, Ismail led the team with 68 catches, 1,105 receiving yards and 6 touchdowns, including career-high 258 yards in one game against the Pittsburgh Steelers. What might have been the high-water mark of Ismail's career and potential crowning moment came on January 28, 2001, when the Baltimore Ravens defeated the New York Giants 34-7 in Tampa, Florida in Super Bowl XXXV. Ismail caught a 47-yard reception and earned his first Super Bowl ring.

The next year, his final season in Baltimore, Ismail had his best season, leading the Ravens with 74 receptions and 7 touchdowns, both career-highs.

In 2002, Ismail signed a one-year deal with the Indianapolis Colts as a #2 wide receiver behind Marvin Harrison.

NFL career statistics

Broadcast career
After retiring from the NFL, Ismail began a career in broadcasting, spending time with Comcast Sports Net, BET Black College Football, and ESPN before becoming part of the Ravens’ broadcast team. In March 2017, it was announced that Ismail would be a color commentator for the Baltimore Brigade of the Arena Football League.

Personal life
Ismail is the brother of Raghib "The Rocket" Ismail and Sulaiman "The Bomb" Ismail. He has three children Qalea, Qadry, and Qadir from his marriage to Holly Oslander Ismail. Ismail is a sports performance coach (Missile Training) at the Sports Factory in Bel Air, Maryland. He has worked with hundreds of athletes helping them improve on their fitness and speed.

Ismail served as the head coach of the Patterson Mill High School boys track and field team from 2011-2019. His daughter, Qalea, plays basketball at Princeton University. In 2017, his son, Qadry, began playing wide receiver at Mercyhurst University. In December 2017, his son, Qadir, signed to play quarterback at Villanova.

References

1970 births
Living people
Players of American football from Pennsylvania
African-American Christians
African-American players of American football
American football return specialists
American football wide receivers
Sportspeople from Wilkes-Barre, Pennsylvania
Players of American football from Newark, New Jersey
Converts to Christianity
Converts to Protestantism from Islam
American former Muslims
Syracuse Orange football players
Minnesota Vikings players
Green Bay Packers players
Miami Dolphins players
New Orleans Saints players
Baltimore Ravens players
Indianapolis Colts players
National Football League announcers
Baltimore Ravens announcers
Arena football announcers
21st-century African-American sportspeople
20th-century African-American sportspeople